Minden is a ghost town in Kemper County, Mississippi. It possessed a post office  from 1898 to 1915.

History 

References

Geography of Kemper County, Mississippi
Unincorporated communities in Mississippi